Seaside is a city in Clatsop County, Oregon,  United States, on the coast of the Pacific Ocean. The name Seaside is derived from Seaside House, a historic summer resort built in the 1870s by railroad magnate Ben Holladay. The city's population was 6,457 at the 2010 census.

History

The Clatsop were a historic Native American tribe that had a village named Ne-co-tat (in their Chinook language) in this area. Indigenous peoples had long inhabited the coastal area.

About January 1, 1806, a group of men from the Lewis and Clark Expedition built a salt-making cairn at the site later developed as Seaside. The city was not incorporated until February 17, 1899, when coastal resort areas were being settled.

In 1912, Alexandre Gilbert (1843–1932) was elected Mayor of Seaside. Gilbert was a French immigrant, a veteran of the Franco Prussian War (1870-1871). After living in San Francisco, California and Astoria, Oregon, Gilbert moved to Seaside where he had a beach cottage (built in 1885). Gilbert was a real estate developer who donated land to the City of Seaside for its one-and-a-half-mile-long Promenade, or "Prom," along the Pacific beach.

In 1892, he added to his beach cottage. Nearly 100 years later, what was known as the Gilbert House was operated commercially as the Gilbert Inn since the mid-1980s. Both it and Gilbert's eponymous "Gilbert Block" office building on Broadway still survive.

Gilbert died at home in Seaside and is interred in Ocean View Abbey Mausoleum in Warrenton.

Geography

The city is developed on both sides of the Necanicum River, which flows to the ocean at the city's northern edge. Tillamook Head towers over the southern edge of the city.

The geography associated with the gradual slope of the broad sandy beaches of Clatsop Spit provide excellent conditions for the formation of beds of millions of Pacific razor clams annually. The razor clams attract thousands of visitors to Seaside Beach each year. Waves attract surfers all year round from the challenging point break off the tip of Tillamook Head to the sandy shores at "the cove" parking lot at Ocean Vista Drive.

Climate
Seaside has an oceanic climate (Köppen Cfb), typical Pacific Northwest  climate, bordering very closely on a warm-summer Mediterranean climate (Köppen Csb). It receives rainy winters and mild-to-cool summers. The warmest heatwaves, however, occur in September.

Tsunami inundation zone

Part of Seaside is located in a tsunami inundation zone. Among other preparation, the City of Seaside has embarked on a program in which residents above the zone are asked to volunteer to store within their homes barrels of medical supplies, water purification systems, emergency rations, tarps, and radios, with each barrel having enough supplies to last 20 individuals for at least 3 days. As of January 2017, there are 119 barrels within volunteer households and a waiting list of interested households.

Seismologists estimate that there is a one in three chance that Seaside will be hit by an earthquake and tsunami within the next fifty years.  On Tues. Nov. 8, 2016, Seaside citizens voted 65% to 35% to issue $99.7 million in bonds to move the remaining three schools out of the tsunami inundation zone.

Demographics

As of the census of 2010, there were 6,457 people, 2,969 households, and 1,565 families residing in the city. The racial makeup of the city was 88.1% White, 0.6% African American, 0.8% Native American, 1.4% Asian, 0.1% Pacific Islander, 5.8% from other races, and 3.1% from two or more races. Hispanic or Latino of any race were 12.4% of the population.

There were 2,969 households, of which 24.2% had children under the age of 18 living with them, 35.4% were married couples living together, 11.5% had a female householder with no husband present, 5.8% had a male householder with no wife present, and 47.3% were non-families. 38.6% of all households were made up of individuals, and 15.4% had someone living alone who was 65 years of age or older. The average household size was 2.16 and the average family size was 2.83.

The median age in the city was 41.5 years. 20% of residents were under the age of 18; 9.3% were between the ages of 18 and 24; 24.7% were from 25 to 44; 28.6% were from 45 to 64; and 17.4% were 65 years of age or older. The gender makeup of the city was 48.3% male and 51.7% female.

Arts and culture
Seaside holds an art walk the first Saturday of each month from March through December. Several galleries are located along Broadway street in the historic Gilbert District.

The Seaside Jazz Festival (formerly the Oregon Dixieland Jubilee) was a long-running annual festival that featured some of the most popular Trad Jazz and Swing bands in the US and Canada.

Annual cultural events
Seaside hosts an annual 4th of July celebration which includes a parade, outdoor concerts, and one of the largest fireworks displays on the west coast.

Every spring until 2016 (in 2017 and 2018, the conference was moved to Salem, and the Dorchester Conference was moved to Welches, Oregon in 2019), Seaside hosted the Dorchester Conference, a convention of Oregon political activists, typically conservative, independent, or center-right. This convention was founded in 1964 by then-state representative Bob Packwood as a forum for all Republicans statewide.

In the 1990s, it became dominated by members of the conservative branch of the party. Over the years the conference has attracted visits from presidential candidates, debates between Republican primary candidates, and discussions of wider political and social issues. It is run by an independent board and is not formally affiliated with the Oregon Republican Party.

The Miss Oregon Pageant, the official state finals to the Miss America Pageant, takes place annually at the Seaside Civic and Convention Center.

Seaside Beach Volleyball, the 2nd largest Beach Volleyball Tournament in the world takes place annually on the 2nd weekend of August. Started in 1982 the tournament has grown each year. In 2022 Seaside Beach Volleyball had over 1,800 teams and 192 courts for the four days of tournament play.

The annual Salt Maker's Return is held in September. The themed event celebrates Seaside history.

The beach and promenade at Seaside serve as the finish line for the Hood to Coast and Portland to Coast relays, held annually on the weekend before Labor Day.

Museums and other points of interest
Seaside is home to the Seaside Aquarium, featuring living regional marine life, a hands-on discovery center, and a  gray whale skeleton, all within a short walk from the Lewis & Clark monument.

The Seaside Museum & Historical Society features exhibits on local and regional history, and offers tours of the Butterfield Cottage, which has been restored to its 1912 state.

Murals adorn several buildings throughout Seaside, depicting history, marine life, and life in Seaside.

The Seaside Visitors Bureau and Travel Oregon Welcome Center offers one-on-one information for travelers to Seaside, as well as maps, magazines, public restrooms, and an oversized Adirondack chair popular for selfies with those traveling along the 101.

Media

Newspaper
Seaside Signal

Radio
KSWB — 840 AM  (Classic Hits)
KBGE — 94.9 FM (AAA)
KCYS — 96.5 FM  (Country)
KCRX — 102.3 FM  (Classic Rock)
KMUN — 91.9 FM

Transportation 
Seaside has two major highways, U.S. Route 101 and U.S. Route 26.
Seaside is served by an intercity bus system.
Seaside Municipal Airport
Seaside is currently working on a Transportation System Plan (TSP). It will serve as the transportation element of the City of Seaside's Comprehensive Plan. The TSP will describe how the transportation network in Seaside is being used now and how it is expected to be used in the future (in 2022).TSPs need to be developed according to the State of Oregon's Transportation Planning Rule. At the end of the project, the recommended improvements will be consistent with the Clatsop County TSP and the Oregon Highway Plan.

Notable people

Deborah Boone (born 1951), member of Oregon's House of Representatives
Ken Carpenter (1926–2011), American football player
Betsy Eby (born 1967), painter
Charles Irving Elliott (1892-1972), Aviation Pioneer
Karl Marlantes (born 1944), author,  businessman and decorated Marine veteran.
Ruth Radelet (born 1982), singer and musician of Chromatics
Ormond Robbins (1910–1984), author
John Schlee (1939–2000), golfer
Norton Simon (1907–1993), industrialist and philanthropist 
E. E. Smith (1890–1965), author
Tsin-is-tum (c. 1814–1905), Native American folklorist
Mark Wiebe (born 1956), golfer

References

External links

 City of Seaside (official website)
 Seaside Visitors Bureau
 Entry for Seaside in the Oregon Blue Book
 Seaside Chamber of Commerce
 Seaside Historical Society
 Seaside Downtown Development Association

 
1899 establishments in Oregon
Astoria, Oregon micropolitan area
Cities in Clatsop County, Oregon
Cities in Oregon
Oregon Coast
Populated coastal places in Oregon
Populated places established in 1899
Seaside resorts in Oregon